The Commander of the Mexican Army is the professional head of the Mexican Army. The position was established following major reforms to the Mexican Armed Forces in 2020.

List of officeholders

References

Military of Mexico
Mexico